The fugu in Japanese, bogeo (鰒魚) or bok in Korean, and hétún (河豚; 河魨) in Standard Modern Chinese is a pufferfish, normally of the genus Takifugu, Lagocephalus, or Sphoeroides, or a porcupinefish of the genus Diodon, or a dish prepared from these fish.

Fugu can be lethally poisonous to humans due to its tetrodotoxin, meaning it must be carefully prepared to remove toxic parts and to avoid contaminating the meat.

The restaurant preparation of fugu is strictly controlled by law in Japan and several other countries, and only chefs who have qualified after three or more years of rigorous training are allowed to prepare the fish. Domestic preparation occasionally leads to accidental death.

Fugu is served as sashimi and nabemono. The liver was served as a traditional dish named fugu-kimo, being widely thought to be a tasty part, but it is also the most poisonous, and serving this organ in restaurants was banned in Japan in 1984. Fugu has become one of the most celebrated dishes in Japanese cuisine.

Diversity 

There are close to 200 species in the family Tetraodontidae (pufferfish), a family of primarily marine and estuarine fish of the order Tetraodontiformes. However, only some of them are eaten and traded as "fugu".

Toxicity
Fugu contains lethal amounts of the poison tetrodotoxin in its organs, especially the liver, the ovaries, eyes, and skin. The poison, a sodium channel blocker, paralyzes the muscles while the victim stays fully conscious; the poisoned victim is unable to breathe, and eventually dies from asphyxiation. There is no known antidote for fugu poison. The standard treatment is to support the respiratory and circulatory systems until the poison is metabolized and excreted by the victim's body.

Researchers have determined that a fugu's tetrodotoxin comes from eating other animals infested with tetrodotoxin-laden bacteria, to which the fish develops insensitivity over time. Whether tetrodotoxin is sequestered from or produced by symbiotic bacteria is still debated. As such, efforts have been made in research and aquaculture to allow farmers to produce safe fugu. Farmers now produce poison-free fugu by keeping the fish away from the bacteria; Usuki, a town in Ōita Prefecture, has become known for selling non-poisonous fugu.

Consumption

History

The inhabitants of Japan have eaten fugu for centuries. Fugu bones have been found in several shell middens, called kaizuka, from the Jōmon period that date back more than 2,300 years. The Tokugawa shogunate (1603–1868) prohibited the consumption of fugu in Edo and its area of influence. It became common again as the power of the Shōgunate weakened. In western regions of Japan, where the government's influence was weaker and fugu was easier to get, various cooking methods were developed to safely eat them. During the Meiji Era (1867–1912), fugu was again banned in many areas. According to one fugu chef in Tokyo, the Emperor of Japan has never eaten fugu due to an unspecified "centuries old ban". 

In China, the use of the pufferfish for culinary purposes was already well established by the Song dynasty as one of the 'three delicacies of the Yangtze' (長江三鮮), alongside saury and Reeve's shad, and appears in the writings of the polymath Shen Kuo as well as in the encyclopedic work Taiping Guangji. The scholar-statesman Su Shi famously remarked that the taste is worthy of death (值那一死).

Species
The torafugu, or tiger pufferfish (Takifugu rubripes), is the most prestigious edible species and the most poisonous. Other species are also eaten; for example, Higanfugu (T. pardalis), Shōsaifugu (T. vermicularis syn. snyderi), and Mafugu (T. porphyreus). The Ministry of Health, Labour and Welfare of Japan provides a list that shows which species' body parts can be consumed. The list names safe genera including pufferfish of the Lagocephalus and Sphoeroides genera and the related porcupinefish (Harisenbon) of the family Diodontidae.

Regulations

Strict fishing regulations are now in place to protect fugu populations from depletion. Most fugu is now harvested in the spring during the spawning season and then farmed in floating cages in the Pacific Ocean. The largest wholesale fugu market in Japan is in Shimonoseki.

Fugu prices rise in autumn and peak in winter, the best season, because they fatten to survive the cold. Live fish arrive at a restaurant, surviving in a large tank, usually prominently displayed. Prepared fugu is also often available in grocery stores, which must display official license documents. Whole fish may not be sold to the general public.

Since 1958, fugu chefs must earn a license to prepare and sell fugu to the public. This involves a two- or three-year apprenticeship. The licensing examination process consists of a written test, a fish-identification test, and a practical test, preparing and eating the fish. Only about 35 percent of the applicants pass. Small miscalculations result in failure or, in rare cases, death. Consumers believe that this training process makes it safer to eat fugu in restaurants or markets. Non-poisonous fugu can be produced by keeping the fish away from the bacteria that makes them poisonious. 

Since October 2012, restaurants in Japan have been permitted to sell fugu that has been prepared and packaged by a licensed practitioner elsewhere.

Cost
In the case of torafugu, the most common fugu, the cost is between ¥1000 and ¥5000 per kilogram, depending on the season. The expense encourages chefs to slice the fish very carefully to obtain the largest possible amount of meat. A special knife, called fugu hiki, is usually stored separately from other knives.

Toxin

Tetrodotoxin (TTX) is a natural product that has, as of 2015, been isolated not only from pufferfish, but also from octopuses, from crabs and shellfish, and from frogs and newts, as well as from other aquatic animals (see below). It is a potent neurotoxin that shuts down electrical signaling in nerves; it acts via interaction with components of the sodium channels in the cell membranes of those cells. It does not cross the blood–brain barrier. In the case of the pufferfish host, at least (see below), their insusceptibility to the poison results from a mutation in their sequence of their specific types of sodium channel proteins.

TTX is not produced by pufferfish and the other aquatic animals from which it has been isolated; rather, bacteria such as 
Alteromonas, Shewanella, and Vibrio species infect or cohabit with the animal species from which TTX is isolated, and a bacterial biosynthetic pathway for its production has been rationalized.

In animal studies with mice, the median lethal dose of TTX was found to be 232 µg per kg body weight. Tetrodotoxin levels are affected by preparation (removal of most toxic materials, treatments such as curing and pickling, see below); it is, however, reportedly not significantly affected by cooking.

Treatment
The symptoms of tetrodotoxin poisoning include dizziness, exhaustion, headache, nausea, or difficulty breathing. The person remains conscious but cannot speak or move. In high doses, breathing stops and asphyxiation follows.

There is no known antidote, and treatment consists of emptying the stomach, administering activated charcoal to bind the toxin, and putting the person on life support until the poison has worn off. Toxicologists have been working on developing an antidote for tetrodotoxin.

Incidents
Statistics from the Tokyo Bureau of Social Welfare and Public Health indicate 20 to 44 incidents, some affecting multiple diners, of fugu poisoning per year between 1996 and 2006 in Japan. Between 34 and 64 people were hospitalized, and zero to six died, per year, with an average fatality rate of 6.8%. Of the 23 incidents reported in Tokyo from 1993 through 2006, only one took place in a restaurant; all others involved people catching and eating the fish. Poisonings through amateur preparation can result from confusion between types of puffer, as well as improper methods, and some may represent deliberate suicide attempts. Engelbert Kaempfer, a German physician who resided in Japan in the 1690s, reported that an unusually toxic variety of puffer was sometimes sought out by individuals who wished to take their own lives.

Much higher figures were reported in earlier years, peaking in 1958 when 176 people died from eating fugu in a single year. According to the Fugu Research Institute, 50% of the victims were poisoned by eating the liver, 43% from eating the ovaries, and 7% from eating the skin. One of the most famous victims was the Kabuki actor and "Living National Treasure" Bandō Mitsugorō VIII, who in 1975 died after eating four servings of fugu kimo (fugu liver), the sale of which was prohibited by local ordinances at the time. Bandō claimed to be able to resist the poison, but died several hours after returning to his hotel.

On August 23, 2007, a doctor in Thailand reported that unscrupulous fish sellers sold puffer meat disguised as salmon, which caused fifteen deaths over three years. About 115 people were taken to different hospitals. Fugu had been banned in Thailand five years prior to the deaths.

In March 2008, a fisherman in the Philippines died and members of his family became ill from pufferfish. The previous year, four people in the same town died and five others had fallen ill after eating the same variety of pufferfish.

In February 2009, a Malaysian fisherman died and four others were hospitalised after they consumed a meal of pufferfish when they ran out of food while at sea.

In November 2011, a chef at two-Michelin star "Fugu Fukuji" in Tokyo was suspended from his post. The chef served fugu liver to a customer who, despite being warned of the risks, specifically asked that it be provided. The 35-year-old customer subsequently required hospital treatment for mild symptoms of tetrodotoxin paralysis, but made a full recovery.

Five men were poisoned at a restaurant in Wakayama in March 2015 after specifically asking for liver.

In December 2020, 3 people in the Philippines died, while 4 more were hospitalized after eating pufferfish.

Preparations

Japan 
 Sashimi — The most popular dish is fugu sashimi, also called Fugu sashi or tessa.
 Milt — The soft roe (Shirako) of the blowfish is a highly prized food item in Japan, and it is often found in department stores. Along with cod milt, it is one of the most popular kinds of soft roe, and it is often grilled and served with salt.
 Fried — Fugu can be eaten deep fried as Fugu Kara-age.
 Smoked — Fugu-fin sake. Sake infused with the smoked fin of the blowfish (fugu) to give a distinctive smoky, fishy flavour known as Hire-zake.
 Stew — Vegetables and fugu can be simmered as Fugu-chiri, also called tetchiri, in which case the fish's very light taste is hard to distinguish from the vegetables and the dip.
 Salad — If the spikes in the skin are pulled out, the skin can be eaten as part of a salad called yubiki.

In the cuisine of Hakusan, Ishikawa, ovaries are served after effort is made to reduce the toxin level by salting and pickling for three years—e.g., in "Blowfish Ovaries Pickled in Rice-Bran Paste" (河豚の卵巣の糠漬け, ふぐのらんそうのぬかづけ). Only the "Mikawa district of Hakusan City, the Ono and Kanaiwa districts of Kanazawa City, and Wajima City, all in Ishikawa Prefecture" are permitted to perform the process, and only by the traditional method, and explicit warnings are offered to dissuade non-professionals from attempting the 3-year process. After one year of pickling—about a third of the way through the process—about 10% of the toxin is suggested to remain, and after the full three years the product is "only sold after having been checked for safety through a toxicity inspection, and other tests."

Korea 
In Korean cuisine, edible pufferfish are prepared in various ways including gui (grilling), jorim (simmering), jjim, Bulgogi, Hoe (raw fish) and guk (soup).

Availability
Most Japanese cities have one or more fugu restaurants, perhaps in clusters because of earlier restrictions, as proximity made it easier to ensure freshness. A famous restaurant specializing in fugu is Takefuku, in the Ginza district in Tokyo. Zuboraya is another popular chain in Osaka.

In South Korea, fugu is known as bok-eo (복어). It is very popular in port cities such as Busan and Incheon. It is prepared in a number of dishes such as soups and salads, and commands a high price.

The fugu is cleaned of the most toxic parts in Japan and freeze-flown to the United States under license in customized, clear, plastic containers. Fugu chefs for American restaurants are trained under the same rigorous specifications as in Japan. Pufferfish native to American waters, particularly the genus Spheroides, have also been consumed for food, sometimes resulting in poisonings.

Sale of fish belonging to this genus is forbidden altogether in the European Union. In Switzerland, the import of fugu is legal, but only as long as it is purchased for private use exclusively.

Japanese restaurateur Nobuyoshi Kuraoka waged a five-year battle with the Food and Drug Administration to allow exclusive import of the Japanese Tiger puffer to his restaurant in Manhattan, with the license granted in 1989. By 2003 only seventeen restaurants in the United States were licensed to serve fugu; fourteen in New York State, twelve of which are based within New York City.

Social aspects

In the Kansai region, the slang word teppō, meaning rifle or gun, is used for the fish. This is a play of words on the verb ataru, which can mean to be poisoned or shot. In Shimonoseki region, the ancient pronunciation fuku is more common instead of the modern fugu. The former is also a homonym for good fortune whereas the latter is one for disabled.The Tsukiji fish market fugu association holds a service each year at the height of the fugu season, releasing hundreds of caught fugu into the Sumida River. A similar ceremony is also held at another large market in Shimonoseki.

A rakugo, or humorous short story, tells of three men who prepared a fugu stew but were unsure whether it was safe to eat. To test the stew, they gave some to a beggar. When it did not seem to do him any harm, they ate the stew. Later, they met the beggar again and were delighted to see that he was still in good health. After that encounter, the beggar, who had hidden the stew instead of eating it, knew that it was safe and he could eat it. The three men had been fooled by the wise beggar.

Lanterns can be made from the bodies of preserved fugu. These are occasionally seen outside of fugu restaurants, as children's toys, as folk art, or as souvenirs. Fugu skin is also made into everyday objects like wallets or waterproof boxes.

Aquaculture
Scientists at Nagasaki University have succeeded in culturing non-toxic torafugu by restricting the fish's diet. The experiment included raising over 5,000 fish between the years 2001–2004, and analyzing the toxicity of muscle, skin, gonads, livers, and other organs. The team concluded that the amount of tetrodotoxin in all those parts was non-toxic, and it would allow for the safe preparation of fugu-kimo (puffer liver).

 See also 
Culture of Japan
Cuisine of Japan
Culture of Korea
Cuisine of Korea
Fugu Plan
 List of delicacies
Shanghai Fugu AgreementTakifugu''
"One Fish, Two Fish, Blowfish, Blue Fish"
Sequencing of the Takifugu genome

References

Further reading 

 
 
 
 
 
Sueyoshi´, Sueyoshi's pages on fishes. Retrieved Sep 11, 2004

External links 

 Personal Account of surviving a fugu poisoning
 BBC article with video of fugu preparation
 Fugu eaten from the Red Sea, with no poisoning at all
 A Delicacy to Die For at National Geographic Magazine
 
Saveur Magazine video of Manhattan's Restaurant Nippon's Fugu dishes. 
Subtitled documentary on Nobuyoshi Kuraoka's 5-year battle with the FDA to serve Fugu at his Manhattan restaurant.

Articles containing video clips
Japanese cuisine terms
Japanese seafood
Korean seafood
Tetraodontidae
Potentially dangerous food